István Soltész (born 29 November 2000) is a Hungarian professional footballer who plays for Budafoki MTE.

Career statistics
.

References

2000 births
Living people
Footballers from Budapest
Hungarian footballers
Association football midfielders
Budapest Honvéd FC II players
Budafoki LC footballers
Nemzeti Bajnokság I players
Nemzeti Bajnokság II players